Iporanga is a municipality in the state of São Paulo in Brazil. The population is 4,199 (2020 est.) in an area of 1152 km². The elevation is 81 m.

Iporanga contains parts of the Alto Ribeira and Baixo Ribeira sub-basins of the Ribeira de Iguape River basin.
The municipality contains part of the  Serra do Mar Environmental Protection Area, created in 1984.
It contains part of the  Intervales State Park, created in 1995.
It contains part of the  Caverna do Diabo State Park, created in 2008.
It contains 55% of the  Quilombos do Médio Ribeira Environmental Protection Area, established in 2008.

References

Municipalities in São Paulo (state)